is a Japanese badminton player from the Saishunkan team. She was the bronze medalists at the Asian and World Junior Championships in 2014 and 2015. Shida won her first international title at the 2016 Vietnam International, and claimed her first BWF World Tour at the 2018 Chinese Taipei Open.

Achievements

BWF World Junior Championships 
Girls' doubles

Mixed doubles

Asian Junior Championships 
Girls' doubles

BWF World Tour (9 titles, 9 runners-up) 
The BWF World Tour, which was announced on 19 March 2017 and implemented in 2018, is a series of elite badminton tournaments sanctioned by the Badminton World Federation (BWF). The BWF World Tour is divided into levels of World Tour Finals, Super 1000, Super 750, Super 500, Super 300, and the BWF Tour Super 100.

Women's doubles

BWF International Challenge/Series (2 titles, 2 runners-up) 
Women's doubles

Mixed doubles

  BWF International Challenge tournament
  BWF International Series tournament

References

External links 
 

1997 births
Living people
Sportspeople from Akita Prefecture
Japanese female badminton players